Ian D. MacGregor (born April 13, 1983) is an American professional road racing cyclist. MacGregor last rode for UCI Continental team  and is the former US Under 23 National Road Champion. In 2006 he founded the Just Go Harder Foundation with fellow professional cyclist Timmy Duggan (Garmin-Transitions).

Biography
MacGregor was born in Nederland, Colorado. He skied competitively in high school and began cycling to maintain conditioning during the off season. After high school, he began cycling professionally.

Just Go Harder Foundation
In 2006 Duggan and Ian MacGregor founded the Just Go Harder Foundation to create scholarships for children who would not be able to afford the opportunity to be part of skiing and cycling clubs.

Major victories
Source:
2004
 1st  National under-23 road race championships
2005
 1st  National under-23 road race championships
2007
 1st Stage 5 Tour de Beauce
2008
 1st Stage 2 Fitchburg Longsjo Classic

References

External links

Cycling News: Ian MacGregor: Team Affiliations

1983 births
Living people
American male cyclists
People from Boulder County, Colorado
Cyclists from Colorado